Events in the year 2016 in Slovenia.

Incumbents
President: Borut Pahor
Prime Minister: Miro Cerar

Events

Deaths

28 January – Aleš Debeljak, cultural critic, poet and essayist (b. 1961).
1 February – Dušan Velkaverh, lyricist (b. 1943)
27 February – Vid Pečjak, writer and psychologist (b. 1929).
11 March – Tita Kovač Artemis, chemist and writer (b. 1930).
7. May – Ignac Gregorač, architect, journalist, and Partisan (b. 1916) 
19 August – Mira Stupica, actress (b. 1923)

References

 
Years of the 21st century in Slovenia
Slovenia
Slovenia
2010s in Slovenia